Vypolzovo is a rural locality (a village) in Nizhneyerogodskoye Rural Settlement, Velikoustyugsky District, Vologda Oblast, Russia. The population was 15 as of 2002.

Geography 
Vypolzovo is located 41 km southwest of Veliky Ustyug (the district's administrative centre) by road. Lodeyka is the nearest rural locality.

References 

Rural localities in Velikoustyugsky District